Alaa Mohammed Mayhoub (born 1 September 1962) is an Egyptian football midfielder who played for Egypt in the 1990 FIFA World Cup. He also played for Al-Ahly S.C.

References

External links
FIFA profile

1962 births
Egyptian footballers
Egypt international footballers
Association football midfielders
Al Ahly SC players
1990 FIFA World Cup players
Living people
Egyptian Premier League players
1986 African Cup of Nations players
Africa Cup of Nations-winning players